NCAA Season 94 is the 2018–19 collegiate athletic year of the National Collegiate Athletic Association of the Philippines. It is hosted by University of Perpetual Help System DALTA.

Calendar
Basketball will start the season, with the customary defending champion vs. host school opening game between San Beda and Perpetual being held at the Mall of Asia Arena on July 7.

Basketball
The basketball tournaments for NCAA Season 94 began on July 7, 2018, at the Mall of Asia Arena to a crowd of 19,204. The referee pool from the Maharlika Pilipinas Basketball League will be used for officiating purposes.

Seniors' tournament

Elimination round

Playoffs

Juniors' tournament

Elimination round

Playoffs

Volleyball

The volleyball tournament of the NCAA Season 94 started on November 23, 2018, at the Filoil Flying V Arena in San Juan, Philippines.

Men's tournament

Elimination round

Playoffs

Women's tournament

Elimination round

Playoffs

See also
UAAP Season 81

Broadcast coverage
Play by Play
Migz Bustos
Andrei Felix
Mico Halili (Basketball only)
Martin Javier
Anton Roxas

Analyst (Basketball)
Martin Antonio
Danica Jose
Mikee Reyes
Renren Ritualo
LA Tenorio

Courtside Reporter
Ganiel Krishnan
Angelique Manto
Roxanne Montealegre
Ceej Tantengco
Aya De Quiroz
Chase Orozco

References

2018 in multi-sport events
2019 in multi-sport events
2018 in Philippine sport
2019 in Philippine sport
National Collegiate Athletic Association (Philippines) seasons